Baredine  is a village in Istria County in Croatia. Administratively it belongs to Buzet.

Geography 
It lies at the centre of Istria Peninsula, 23 km from Pazin and 5 km from the centre of the settlement to the Northwest, near Stream Mirna and the border with Slovenia. There is a segregated bicycle road between Brtonigla and Baredine.

History 
As an evidence of the excavations, there was here a settlement in the pre-historic period as well, There were some findings from the Roman period. Population came here before the Ottomans during the 15th century. Its citizens worked as farmers, they grew grapes, olives, grains, and corns. Some of them lived from animals, such as cow, ship, donkey or pig.

Historical population

Sources

External links 
Home page of Buzet
Home page of Buzet's Tourist Office
Baredine in Istarska encyclopedia

Municipalities of Croatia
Populated places in Istria County